Vassili Grigorjev (11 March 1870 Dymkovo, Pechorsky District, Russian Empire – ?) was a Russian-Estonian farmer and politician.

He was born in Dymkovo in Perchorsky District, into a poor peasant family. He received a secondary education. After military service, he worked for the Russian Ministry of Internal Affairs for 22 years. In 1918, he moved to Estonia, where he became a farmer. He later became a pediatrician and journalist.

Grigorjev was a member of the Riigikogu for the Estonian Labour Party from 1920 to 1929.

In 1927, Grigorjev and a number of other people from Petseri County were arrested on charges of treason due to them planning a possible separatist movement in Petseri County and Narva in response to Petseri County being given to Estonia as a result of the Treaty of Tartu, as well as working with Soviet intelligence as a member of the Riigikogu. He was sentenced to death in absentia.

After the Baltic Operation, where Nazi Germany invaded the Baltic States, Grigorjev was captured by their forces. His fate is unknown.

References 

1870 births
Year of death unknown
People from Pechorsky District
People from Pskovsky Uyezd
Estonian people of Russian descent
Estonian Labour Party politicians
Members of the Riigikogu, 1920–1923
Members of the Riigikogu, 1923–1926
Members of the Riigikogu, 1926–1929
Civil servants of the Russian Empire
Place of death unknown